Aurelio Lampredi (16 June 1917 – 1 June 1989) was an Italian automobile and aircraft engine designer.

Born in Livorno, he began his career before World War II at Piaggio, moved to Isotta Fraschini, and then joined Reggiane. This time he designed aircraft engines.

Lampredi's fame brought him to Ferrari in 1946. He temporarily quit the company to go back to Isotta Fraschini in March 1947 but returned to Ferrari at the beginning of 1948 where he designed large 3.3, 4.1 and 4.5 L displacement V12 family of engines (the "Lampredi engine") which first saw use in the 1950s 275 S, 275 F1, 340 F1 and 375 F1 race cars.  Lampredi's engines were used as large naturally aspirated alternatives to the diminutive Gioacchino Colombo-designed V12s used in most Ferrari cars until that time.  Especially after the failure of Colombo's supercharged engine in Formula One, Lampredi's design began to find favor in the company.  Lampredi oversaw Ferrari's racing effort during its early success in 1952 and 1953.

In 1951, Enzo Ferrari saw a good opportunity to make a competitive car for Formula Two racing. And the rules for Formula One made it possible that the Formula Two car could also be competitive in Formula One for two years, until new engine regulations came into effect in 1954. So, he suggested to Lampredi that he design a four-cylinder racing engine. This Lampredi twin-cam four cylinder proved very successful in Formula Two, Formula One and sports racing cars.

Lampredi's work at Ferrari ended permanently in 1955 when Ferrari bought Lancia's racing team and famed engine designer Vittorio Jano, formerly of Alfa Romeo.  Though Lampredi's engine designs lived on in Ferrari road cars, Jano's V6 and V12 engines quickly replaced Lampredi's large V12s for racing use.

After Ferrari, Lampredi went to Fiat, where he oversaw that company's engine design efforts until 1977. It was at Fiat where he designed the famous Fiat Twin-Cam and SOHC engines, which provided motive-force for most Fiat and Lancia automobiles for over 32 years. He was also made manager of Fiat's Abarth factory racing group from 1973 through 1982.

He was responsible for designing the engine that allowed Fiat to locate in the Brazilian market in 1976, the FIASA (acronym of Portuguese "Fiat Automóveis S.A). This engine equipped the Fiat 147, a Brazilian derivation of the European Fiat 127. The 147 was the first national vehicle to have a transversely mounted engine with a belt driven overhead camshaft. It was also the first engine made on a large scale to be powered by ethanol, when such a version was made available in the 1979 Fiat 147. The FIASA engine was in production until 2001 (25 years) with continuous changes, when it was superseded by the new FIRE engine.

Lampredi died in Livorno in 1989.

References

1917 births
1989 deaths
People from Livorno
Ferrari people
Formula One engine engineers
Italian motorsport people
Fiat people
Italian automotive engineers